This is a list of notable people who were born in the U.S. state of Virginia, were raised or lived in Virginia, or for whom Virginia is a significant part of their identity. Those not born in Virginia are marked with §.

A

 Alden Aaroe – WRVA talk show host
 Caroline Aaron – actress and producer
 John Aboud – writer, comedian, commentator on Best Week Ever and other VH1 shows
 Jim Acosta – national political correspondent for CNN
 Hunter "Patch" Adams § – doctor, author, and social activist
 Rick Adams – Internet pioneer, founder of UUNET
 Xavier Adibi § – linebacker for Minnesota Vikings
 Chris Adler – drummer (Lamb of God)
 Willie Adler – guitarist (Lamb of God)
 Danny Aiken – long snapper for New England Patriots
 Mary C. Alexander – aviation pioneer
 Andy Allanson – former MLB catcher
 James Anderson § – linebacker for Carolina Panthers 
 Justin Anderson – player for Dallas Mavericks
 V.C. Andrews – novelist; born in Portsmouth, Virginia
 Anhayla – singer, guitarist, YouTube personality
 Andi Arndt – audiobook narrator 
 David Arquette – actor, born on commune in Winchester
 John Ashby – Colonel in the Virginia militia
 Arthur Ashe (1943–1993) – tennis player and social activist
 Bob Asher – former NFL offensive tackle 
 Stephen F. Austin (1793–1836) – first Secretary of State of Republic of Texas
 Kevin Aviance – dancer

B
Ba–Bm

 Nathaniel Bacon (1647–1676) – led Bacon's Rebellion against British authority in 1676
 Diedrich Bader (born 1966) – actor
 Margaret L. Bailey (1812–1888), writer, poet, lyricist, editor, and publisher
 Pearl Bailey – Tony Award-winning actress and singer
 Ronald Bailey § – science editor for Reason magazine
 Dylan Baker § – actor
 David Baldacci – author
 Krystal Ball – businesswoman, co-host of MSNBC show The Cycle
 Gordon Banks – guitarist and songwriter
 Steve Bannon – campaign manager, businessman, media executive, Chief Strategist and Senior Counselor to President Donald Trump 
 Ronde Barber (born 1975) – NFL cornerback
 Tiki Barber (born 1975) – sportscaster, NFL running back
 Don Barclay (born 1989) – NFL offensive lineman
 Kylene Barker – Ms. America 1979
 Melody Barnes (born 1964) – director of Domestic Policy Council for President Barack Obama
 Lauren Barnette – beauty pageant winner and model
 Joey Baron – musician
 Connor Barth (born 1986) – placekicker for Tampa Bay Buccaneers
 Samuel Barton § (1749–1810) – explorer, pioneer; early settler of Nashville, Tennessee
 Viola Baskerville (born 1951) – Virginia Secretary of Administration
 Dave Batista – professional wrestler
 Warren Beatty (born 1937) – actor and Academy Award-winning director
 Beth Behrs § (born 1985) – actress, 2 Broke Girls
 Bob Bender (born 1957) – basketball player and coach
 Antoine Bethea § – football player for San Francisco 49ers
 Larry Bethea § – football player for Dallas Cowboys
 Rainey Bethea (1909–1936) – last person publicly executed in United States
 Leslie Bibb § – actress, Carley Bobby in Talladega Nights: The Ballad of Ricky Bobby
 Jim Bibby – former Major League pitcher; from Madison Heights
 Lewis Binford (1931–2011) – archaeologist 
 Adam Birch – professional wrestler for World Wrestling Entertainment's SmackDown!
 Peter Blair – Olympic bronze medalist in freestyle wrestling
 Benny Blanco – record producer and songwriter
 Tom Bliley – member of United States House of Representatives representing Virginia's 3rd congressional district then 7th congressional district
 Dré Bly – football player with the Detroit Lions
 Randy Blythe – singer of metal band Lamb of God

Bn–Bz

 Bruce Bochy § – manager for San Francisco Giants
 Rudy Boesch § – third-place finalist on Survivor: Pulau Tiga (first season)
 Bill Bolling § – Lieutenant Governor of Virginia
 Gary U.S. Bonds § – singer-songwriter
 J. Evan Bonifant – actor
 Olive Borden – actress
 Maria Boren – contestant on TV's The Apprentice
 Wes Borland – guitarist for Limp Bizkit and other bands
 Th-resa Bostick § – IFBB professional bodybuilder
 Luke Bowanko – center for the Jacksonville Jaguars
 Mary Bowser – freed slave who worked as Union spy during American Civil War, admitted to Military Intelligence Hall of Fame
 Jackie Bradley Jr. – center fielder for Boston Red Sox
 Ahmad Bradshaw (born 1986) – running back for New York Giants
 Karen Briggs § – violinist
 Antwain Britt (born 1978) – mixed martial artist
 Connie Britton § (born 1968) – actress; raised in Lynchburg
 Dave Brockie – founder of GWAR
 Aaron Brooks – football quarterback for Oakland Raiders
 Ahmad Brooks – professional football linebacker for San Francisco 49ers
 Chris Brown (born 1989) – singer and actor
 Duane Brown – offensive tackle for Houston Texans
 Ruth Brown – Grammy Award-award-winning singer and entertainer
 Mika Brzezinski § – television news journalist at MSNBC 
 Shannon Bream – lawyer and Journalist, attended Liberty University
 Bebe Buell – fashion model, groupie; mother of Liv Tyler
 Joyce Bulifant – television actress
 Sandra Bullock (born 1964) – actress
 Plaxico Burress (born 1977) – wide receiver for New York Jets
 Hilarie Burton – actress
 Jeff Burton (born 1967) – NASCAR driver
 Ward Burton (born 1961) – NASCAR driver
 Curtis Bush – world champion kickboxer and actor
 Jermon Bushrod – offensive tackle for Chicago Bears
 Deon Butler – professional football wide receiver for Seattle Seahawks; from Woodbridge
 Eddie Butler – starting pitcher for Colorado Rockies
 Martha Haines Butt (1833-1871) — author 
 Charlie Byrd – jazz guitarist

C

 James Branch Cabell – author of fantasy fiction and belles lettres
 Erin Cahill – actress, Jen Scotts on Power Rangers Time Force
 Alyson Cambridge (born 1980) – operatic soprano and classical music, jazz, and American popular song singer
 Shawn Camp – relief pitcher for Toronto Blue Jays
 John Campbell – bassist (Lamb of God)
 Eric Cantor – member of the United States House of Representatives representing Virginia's 7th congressional district
 Steve Cardenas – martial artist, actor, Rocky DeSantos on Mighty Morphin Power Rangers, Power Rangers: Zeo
 Lott Carey – early African-American colonist and missionary to Liberia
 Jay Carney – White House Press Secretary under U.S. President Barack Obama
 A. P. Carter – musician, singer-songwriter; member of Carter Family
 Allen 'Big Al' Carter – painter, photographer, sculptor and teacher
 Maybelle Carter – guitarist, singer, member of Carter Family; mother of June Carter Cash
 Robert "King" Carter I (1663–1732) – wealthy colonist businessman
 Sara Carter (1898–1979) – country music singer
 Alan-Michael Cash – defensive tackle for Montreal Alouettes
 June Carter Cash (1929–2003) – singer-songwriter, actress and comedian; member of Carter Family, second wife of Johnny Cash
 Anthony Castonzo § – NFL player
 Jake Cave (born 1992) – outfielder for the Minnesota Twins 
 Christina Chambers (born 1969) – actress and model, One Life to Live, Sunset Beach
 Kam Chancellor (born 1988) – strong safety for Seattle Seahawks
 David Chang – restaurateur
 Anthony Clark – actor (television sitcoms Yes, Dear and Boston Common); born in Lynchburg
 Florence Anderson Clark (1835-1918) - university librarian and administrator
 George Rogers Clark (1752–1818) – American Revolutionary War military leader
 William Clark (1770–1838) – explorer (Lewis and Clark Expedition); brother of George Rogers Clark
 Roy Clark – country musician born in Meherrin, Virginia
 Henry Clay (1777–1852) – 19th-century statesman
 Clarence Clemons (1942–2011) – saxophonist for Bruce Springsteen's E Street Band, played football for Norfolk Neptunes
 Patsy Cline (1932–1963) – singer
 Jim Coates – former MLB pitcher, primarily with New York Yankees
 Sarah Johnson Cocke - writer and civic leader
 Coko – member of SWV, gospel music singer
 Catherine Coleman § (born 1960) – NASA astronaut
 Francis Collins – physician-geneticist, director of National Institutes of Health
 Mike Compton – NFL player
 Stacy Compton – NASCAR driver and team owner; born in Hurt
 Kavell Conner – linebacker for Indianapolis Colts
 Matthew Continetti – journalist, editor-in-chief of The Washington Free Beacon
 Scott Cooper – actor, writer, director
 Michael Copon – actor, Lucas Kendall in Power Rangers: Time Force
 Leanza Cornett – Miss America, actress, TV commentator
 Alex Cosmidis – baseball player, manager, scout
 Joseph Cotten (1905–1994) – actor
 Patricia Cornwell § – novelist
 Katie Couric (born 1957) – television personality
 Michael Covel – author and documentarian
 Robert Cray § (born 1953) – blues musician
 Henry Creamer – vaudeville song lyricist
 Zach Cregger – actor
 Romeo Crennel (born 1947) – NFL coach
 Kyle Crockett (born 1991) – MLB pitcher
 Amanda Cromwell – professional soccer coach and former player
 Adrian Cronauer § – disc jockey
 Michael Cuddyer (born 1979) – MLB outfielder
 Elizabeth Litchfield Cunnyngham —  missionary and church worker
 Dell Curry (born 1964) – former NBA player for the Charlotte Hornets; father of Golden State Warriors superstar Stephen Curry

D

 D'Angelo – R&B musician
 Dan Daniel – politician, 39th National Commander of American Legion
 Troy Daniels – shooting guard for Charlotte Hornets
 Colgate Whitehead Darden Jr. – Governor of Virginia, Chancellor of the College of William & Mary and President of the University of Virginia
 Wendy Dascomb – Miss USA 1969
 Chris Daughtry § (born 1979) – American Idol finalist; attended high school in Charlottesville
 Ed Davis § – power forward for Toronto Raptors; attended Benedictine High School in Richmond
 Tyrone Davis – NFL tight end, primarily with Green Bay Packers
 Tanya Davis (artist) – artist and past president of the Torpedo Factory Artists Association
 John M. Dawson (1829–1913) -  minister and Virginia Senator
 Jimmy Dean – singer, actor, television personality and "sausage king"
 Serena Deeb – professional wrestler
 Dalvin DeGrate – singer, member of R&B group Jodeci
 Evelyn Magruder DeJarnette (1842-1914) — author
 DeSagana Diop § – center for Charlotte Bobcats; attended Oak Hill Academy in Mouth of Wilson
 Junie Donlavey – owner and namesake of NASCAR "Donlavey" racing team
 Eric Dorsey § – defensive end for New York Giants; attended high school in McLean
 Desmond Doss – United States Army corporal who served as a combat medic during World War II
 Gabby Douglas – artistic gymnast and Olympic gold medalist
 Fanny Murdaugh Downing (1831-1894) — author and poet
 Eliza Ann Dupuy (c. 1814 – 1880) — littérateur and author 
 Kevin Durant § – All-Star small forward for NBA champion Golden State Warriors; attended Oak Hill Academy in Mouth of Wilson

E

 Kenny Easley (born 1959) – NFL safety for the Seattle Seahawks, member of the College Football Hall of Fame and Pro Football Hall of Fame
 Ferrell Edmunds (born 1965) – NFL tight end
 Tremaine Edmunds (born 1998) – NFL linebacker
 Terrell Edmunds (born 1997) – NFL safety
 Trey Edmunds (born 1994) – NFL running back
 Elizabeth Edwards § (1949–2010) – attorney, author; estranged wife to John Edwards
 Missy Elliott (born 1971) – rapper
 Perry Ellis (1940–1986) – fashion designer
 Brother Claude Ely (1922–1978) – singer-songwriter, Pentecostal Holiness preacher
 Phillip H. Emerson (1834–1889) – Justice of the Supreme Court of the Utah Territory from 1873 to 1885
 Garrett Epps (born 1950) – legal scholar, novelist, journalist
 Victoria Espinel (born 1968) – Intellectual Property Enforcement Coordinator under U.S. President Barack Obama
 Chip Esten § (born 1965) – comedian, actor and singer

F

 Jonny Fairplay – Survivor: Pearl Islands contestant and professional wrestler
 Frankie Faison – film actor
 Jerry Falwell (1933–2007) – Christian minister, televangelist, and political activist (Moral Majority)
 James Farrior – NFL linebacker
 William Faulkner § (1897–1962) – author, writer-in-residence at University of Virginia from 1957 until his death
 Florian-Ayala Fauna – artist, musician, music producer
 Mimi Faust – reality TV personality 
 Justin Fairfax (born 1979) – Lieutenant Governor of Virginia 
 Bessie Alexander Ficklen (1861-1945), poet and artist
 Dorian Finney-Smith – NBA player for Dallas Mavericks
 Ella Fitzgerald (1917–1996) – jazz singer
 Roberta Flack § – Grammy Award-winning singer-songwriter, musician
 Gary Fleder – film director, screenwriter, producer
 Charles Follis – first African-American professional football player
 Jon Foreman – lead singer for rock band Switchfoot
 Tim Foreman – bass player for rock band Switchfoot
 Chip Franklin – comedian and talk show host

G

 Lea Gabrielle (born 1975) – journalist and correspondent, Fox News Channel
 Forrest Gander § (born 1956) – poet, essayist and translator
 Greg Garcia – director, producer, creator of sitcoms Raising Hope and My Name Is Earl, co-creator of Yes, Dear
 Clifton Garvin – chief executive officer of Exxon from 1975 to 1986
 Gray Gaulding – Nascar Driver 
 Azita Ghanizada § – actress, Saira Batra on General Hospital: Night Shift
 William Gibson § – cyberpunk author; coined the term 'cyberspace'
 Vince Gilligan – director, producer, creator of Breaking Bad
 Jim Gilmore – Governor of Virginia
 Sheila Giolitti – artist and art dealer
 Jack Gilpin – actor
 Ellen Glasgow – early 20th-century novelist
 Indur M. Goklany – science and technology policy analyst for U.S. Department of the Interior
 Irving Gottesman – professor and professor emeritus at University of Virginia
 Lauren Graham – actress, comedy-drama series Gilmore Girls
 Samuel Gravely – African-American officer who broke many racial barriers in U.S. Navy
 Justin Grimm § – relief pitcher for Chicago Cubs
 David Grohl – musician with Foo Fighters; moved to Virginia at age three
 Johnny Grubb – Major League Baseball player
 Kevin Grubb – NASCAR driver
 Wayne Grubb – NASCAR crew chief and former driver
 Grant Gustin – actor best known for his role as The Flash in the superhero TV series of the same name; born in Norfolk
 Brandon Guyer § – outfielder for Cleveland Indians

H

 Hilary Hahn (born 1979) – two-time Grammy Award-winning violinist
 Charlie Hales § (born 1956) – Mayor of Portland, Oregon
 Charles Haley – football player for Dallas Cowboys, San Francisco 49ers; born in Gladys
 DeAngelo Hall § (born 1983) – cornerback for Washington Redskins
 Fawn Hall (born 1959) – figure in Iran–Contra affair
 Mark Hamill § (born 1951) – actor, known for Star Wars films; attended high school in Annandale
 Peter Hamby § (born 1981) – journalist; attended high school in Richmond
 Denny Hamlin (born 1980) – NASCAR driver, 2006 rookie of the year, and Three time Daytona 500 winner; grew up in Chesterfield
 Zac Hanson (born 1985) – member of pop band Hanson
 Jason Butler Harner § (born 1970) – actor
 Eli Harold (born 1994) – linebacker for San Francisco 49ers
 Justin Harper (born 1989) – power forward for Orlando Magic
 Benjamin Harrison – 23rd President of the United States; grandson of William Henry Harrison
 Benjamin Harrison V – signer of the Declaration of Independence, father of U.S. President William Henry Harrison 
 Carl Hairston (born 1952) – NFL player, Super Bowl champion
 William Henry Harrison (1773–1841) – 9th President of the United States
 Kathryn Harrold (born 1950) – actress
 Bryan Harvey – musician; known for fronting role in House of Freaks; murdered with family in 2006
 Percy Harvin – NFL wide receiver
 Nidal Hasan – U.S. Army psychiatrist; sole suspect in Fort Hood shooting of 2009
 Frank Hassell (born 1988) – basketball player
 Earl Hebner – professional wrestling referee
 Mike Helton – vice chairman of NASCAR
 William Henderson – fullback for Green Bay Packers
 Lauri Hendler – actress, Gimme a Break!
 Rick Hendrick – NASCAR Cup Series team owner for Chase Elliott, Jimmie Johnson, Alex Bowman, and William Byron; born in South Hill
 Molly Henneberg (born 1973) – reporter for Fox News
 Patrick Henry (1736–1799) – American Revolution figure and first Governor of Virginia after nation's independence
 Kate Higgins (born 1969) – anime voice actor
 Grant Hill § (born 1972) – basketball player, Olympic gold medalist, 7-time NBA All-Star
 Laura Hillenbrand (born 1967) – author of books and magazine articles
 Skip Hinnant (born 1940) – actor, The Electric Company
 Mary Evelyn Hitchcock (1849-1920) — author and explorer
 Wendell and Sherman Holmes – blues, gospel and roots musicians
 David Homyk – musician
 Grace Hopper § (1906–1992) – pioneering computer scientist, and United States Navy rear admiral
 Constance Horner (born 1942) – public official in Reagan and first Bush administrations; independent director of Pfizer, Prudential Financial, and Ingersoll Rand; resides in Lexington
 Bruce Hornsby (born 1954) – musician
 Ralph Horween (1896–1997) – Harvard Crimson and NFL football player, centenarian
 Quin Houff (born 1997) – NASCAR driver
 Sam Houston (1793–1863) – born in Rockbridge County; Governor of Tennessee (1827–1829); first and third President of Republic of Texas; Governor of Texas; U.S. Senator from Texas
 David Huddleston (1930–2016) – actor, The Big Lebowski, Blazing Saddles
 Juliet Huddy § (born 1969) – Fox News news anchor; attended high school in McLean
 Daniel Hudson (born 1987) – closer for Washington Nationals
 Steve Huffman (born 1983) – co-founder and CEO of Reddit
 Chad Hugo (born 1974) – musician and music producer, one-half of The Neptunes
 Randy Hundley – catcher for Chicago Cubs
 Al Hunt – columnist for Bloomberg View
 Robert Hurt (born 1969) – U.S. Representative of Virginia's 5th congressional district
 Patrick Hull – entrepreneur based in Richmond

I

 Ashley Iaconetti (born 1988) – television personality
 Arsalan Iftikhar (born 1977) – human rights lawyer, global media commentator, and author
 Brandon Inge (born 1977) – MLB player; from Lynchburg
 James Addison Ingle (1867–1903) § – American missionary to China
 Mike Imoh (born 1984) – former Virginia Tech and Canadian Football League running back
 Andre Ingram (born 1985) – NBA player, NBA G League record holder for most games played
 Jay M. Ipson (born 1935) § – Holocaust survivor and co-founder of the Virginia Holocaust Museum
 Daryl Irvine (born 1964) – former MLB relief pitcher 
 Allen Iverson (born 1975) – former NBA player for the Philadelphia 76ers, Denver Nuggets, Memphis Grizzlies, and Detroit Pistons
 Mark Ivey (born 1973) – college football coach
 Larry Izzo (born 1974) – NFL player, coach

J

 Thomas "Stonewall" Jackson § (1824–1863) – Confederate military leader; born and raised in Clarksburg, West Virginia (which was formerly Virginia)
 Mickie James (born 1979) – professional wrestler and musician
 Tommy Lee James – country music songwriter and record producer
 Thomas Jefferson (1743–1826) – 3rd President of the United States, author of Declaration of Independence, founder of University of Virginia
 Clara Jeffery § (born 1967) – co-editor of Mother Jones magazine
 Rashad Jennings (born 1985) – running back for New York Giants
 Jim Jinkins – cartoonist
 Cornelius Johnson (born 1943) – NFL guard, won Super Bowl V with Baltimore Colts
 Nicole Johnson (born c. 1974) – Miss America 1999
 Wes Johnson – actor and comedian
 Maria I. Johnston (1835-1921) — author, journalist, editor and lecturer
 Arrington Jones (born 1959) – running back for San Francisco 49ers
 Julius Jones (born 1981) – football player for Dallas Cowboys, Seattle Seahawks
 Thomas Jones (born 1978) – running back for Kansas City Chiefs
 Akeem Jordan (born 1985) – linebacker for Philadelphia Eagles
 Cornelia J. M. Jordan (1830-1898) — poet and lyricist
 Henry Jordan (1935–1977) – lineman for Green Bay Packers, member of Pro Football Hall of Fame
 Orlando Jordan – professional wrestler
 Samuel Jordan (died 1621) – earliest Virginia leader at Jamestown Settlement

K

 Tim Kaine § (born 1958) – former Governor and current U.S. Senator, 2016 Democratic nominee for vice president under Hillary Clinton
 Archie Kao § – actor and director
 Josh Kaufman § (born 1976) – Soul singer-songwriter, winner of NBC's The Voice season 7; attended Blacksburg High School
 Jeremy Kapinos § (born 1984) – punter for Pittsburgh Steelers
 Richard Kelly (born 1975) – film director
 Patrick Kilpatrick – actor, Minority Report, Eraser
 Barbara Kingsolver – author; lives outside Abingdon 
 V.J. King (born 1997) – NBA player, attended Paul VI Catholic High School in Fairfax, Virginia
 Wayne Kirby – first base coach for Baltimore Orioles
 Chaney Kley (1972–2007) – actor, Asher on The Shield
 John Kuester (born 1955) – assistant coach for Los Angeles Lakers

L

 Michael Lachowski –  bass guitar player for rock band Pylon
 Jeffrey M. Lacker – chief executive of Fifth District Federal Reserve Bank at Richmond
 Kendall Langford – defensive end for Miami Dolphins
 Rick Langford – MLB pitcher
 Wayne LaPierre – executive vice president of National Rifle Association, author, gun rights advocate
 Mat Latos – MLB pitcher
 Wendy B. Lawrence § (born 1959) – retired U.S. Navy Captain, helicopter pilot, engineer, NASA astronaut
 Wilford Leach (1929–1988) – film and theatre director, screenwriter
 Jake E. Lee (born 1957) – guitarist for Ratt, Rough Cutt, Ozzy Osbourne, Badlands
 Light Horse Harry Lee (1756–1818) – Prince William County; American Revolutionary War hero; father of Robert E. Lee
 Richard Henry Lee (1732–1794) – Westmoreland County; presented proposal for independence to Continental Congress in 1776
 Robert E. Lee (1807–1870) – Confederate States of America military leader, commander of Army of Northern Virginia
 Will Yun Lee – actor
 William Gregory Lee – actor, Dante's Cove
 Tim Legler – ESPN NBA analyst
 Egbert Leigh – evolutionary ecologist 
 Meriwether Lewis (1774–1809) – explorer with Lewis and Clark Expedition
 Shaquan Lewis – aka "Skillz" from Supafriendz, rapper
 Sabrina Lloyd (born 1970) – actress, Sliders, Sports Night, Numb3rs
 Mike London (born 1960) – head football coach at University of Virginia
 Chris Long § (born 1985) – NFL defensive end for New England Patriots
 Hyman Isaac Long (born 18th century) – Freemason
 Kyle Long – NFL offensive lineman
 Javier López § (born 1977) – relief pitcher for San Francisco Giants
 Brandon Lowe (born 1994) – second baseman for the Tampa Bay Rays
 Rob Lowe (born 1964) – actor known for films and TV series including The West Wing, Wayne's World, Parks and Recreation 
 David Lowery – lead singer of Cracker, co-founder Sound of Music Studios
 Rich Lowry (born 1968) – editor of National Review, syndicated columnist, and author
 Henry Lee Lucas (1936–2001) – serial killer
Elaine Luria (born 1975) – member of the U.S. House of Representatives from Virginia's 2nd district, and former United States Navy Commander.

M
Ma–Md

 Douglas MacArthur § (1880–1964) – military leader, born in Arkansas, considered Norfolk his hometown; buried in Norfolk
 Stanton Macdonald-Wright (1890–1973) – artist
 Vernon Macklin (born 1986) – power forward for Detroit Pistons
 Shirley MacLaine (born 1934) – Academy Award-winning actress and author
 Scott Mactavish (born 1965) – filmmaker and author
 James Madison (1751–1836) – 4th President of the United States, co-author of The Federalist Papers, "Father of the United States Constitution"
 Magnum T. A. – professional wrestler
 William Mahone (1826–1895) – Confederate States of America general, founder of Norfolk and Western Railroad (now Norfolk Southern)
 John Maine (born 1981) – MLB pitcher; born in Fredericksburg; graduate of North Stafford High school
 Lee Major – Grammy Nominated Music Producer
 Moses Malone (1955–2015) – NBA player in Basketball Hall of Fame
 Aimee Mann – musician; from Midlothian and Richmond area
 Sally Mann (born 1951) – photographer; from Lexington
 Charlie Manuel § (born 1944) – former manager of Philadelphia Phillies
 EJ Manuel (born 1990) – quarterback for Oakland Raiders
 Chris Marion § (born 1962) – musician, member of classic rock band Little River Band
 Fannie H. Marr (1835-1918) — author and poet
 Henry L. Marsh (born 1933) – first African-American mayor of Richmond, Virginia
 George Marshall § (1880–1959) – U.S. Army officer, World War II military leader, U.S. Secretary of Defense, author of Marshall Plan and recipient of Nobel Peace Prize; graduate of Virginia Military Institute
 John Marshall – lawyer, statesman, and fourth Chief Justice of the United States Supreme Court
 Sean Marshall – MLB pitcher
 David Martin § – tight end for Buffalo Bills
 George Mason (1725–1792) – politician, author of Virginia Declaration of Rights; namesake of George Mason University
 Bobby Massie (born 1989) – offensive tackle for Arizona Cardinals
 Debbie Matenopoulos – television personality
 Dave Matthews § (born 1967) – musician, frontman of Dave Matthews Band; resident of Charlottesville
 Matthew Fontaine Maury (1806–1873) – U.S. Navy officer, astronomer, oceanographer, geologist, educator
 Jerod Mayo (born 1986) – linebacker for New England Patriots
 Jayma Mays (born 1979) – actress, Emma Pillsbury on Glee
 John McAfee § (1945–2021) – software engineer for NASA, Computer Sciences Corporation, and Lockheed, known for McAfee antivirus software
 Danny McBride (born 1976) – actor, star of films and TV series Eastbound and Down; from Fredericksburg
 John McCain § (1936–2018) – Panamanian-born politician, navy officer, U.S. Senator from Arizona from 1986 until his death and 2008 Republican nominee for President; raised in Alexandria and Arlington
 John McCargo (born 1983) – NFL defensive tackle for Buffalo Bills
 Dagen McDowell – anchor on Fox Business Network and correspondent for Fox News Channel
 Michael McGlothlin (born 1951) – president of [University of Appalachia] School of Pharmacy, politician, and activist
 William Holmes McGuffey § (1800–1873) – creator of McGuffey Readers; professor at University of Virginia
 David McLeod (born 1971) – first recipient of Arena Football League Defensive Player of the Year Award
 Billy McMullen – football player for University of Virginia and Minnesota Vikings
 Jesse McReynolds – bluegrass musician, mandolin player

Me–Mz

 Joseph Meek (1810–1875) – explorer and fur trader
 Philip B. Meggs – design historian, author of History of Graphic Design
 Christopher Meloni – actor, Law & Order: SVU; grew up in Alexandria and went to St. Stephens School
 Leland D. Melvin (born 1964) – NASA astronaut
 Joey Mercury (born 1979) – professional wrestler
 LaShawn Merritt – track sprinter, 3-time Olympic gold medalist
 Heath Miller (born 1982) – NFL tight end for Pittsburgh Steelers
 Jason C. Miller § (born 1972) – lead vocalist and guitarist for Godhead
 Mittie Miller (1850-1937) — novelist
 Judson Mills § (born 1969) – actor, Francis Gage on Walker, Texas Ranger
 Nannie Jacquelin Minor (1871–1934) – early practitioner of public health nursing in Virginia 
 Arthur Moats (born 1988) – NFL linebacker for Buffalo Bills
 Modern Groove Syndicate – funk band from Richmond, Virginia
 Darryl Monroe (born 1986) – professional basketball player, 2016 Israeli Basketball Premier League MVP
 James Monroe (1758–1831) – 5th President of the United States; namesake of Monroe Doctrine
 John Montague (born 1947) – MLB pitcher
 Will Montgomery § (born 1983) – NFL lineman for Washington Redskins
 Jim Moody (born 1949) – actor
 Lottie Moon (1840–1912) – Christian missionary to China
 Jim Morrison § (1943–1971) – singer-songwriter for The Doors; born in Florida; graduated from high school in Alexandria
 Mark Morton – guitarist (Lamb of God)
 John Singleton Mosby (1833–1916) – Edgemont; "The Gray Ghost", Confederate cavalry commander 
 William P. Moseley - (1819-1890) businessman and Virginia senator
 Wendell Moore Jr. (born 2001) – basketball player 
 Alonzo Mourning (born 1970) – basketball player, Olympic gold medalist, member of Basketball Hall of Fame
 Jason Mraz (born 1977) – musician
 John Mullan (1830–1909) – soldier, explorer, civil servant, and road builder
 Dermot Mulroney (born 1963) – actor of many films including My Best Friend's Wedding
 Mick Mulvaney (born 1967) – Director of the Office of Management and Budget
 Lenda Murray § (born 1962) – IFBB professional bodybuilder
Bret Myers (born 1980) - soccer player and professor
 Lon Myers (1858–1899) – sprinter, multiple world records

N

 Diane Neal (born 1976) – actress; Casey Novak on Law & Order: Special Victims Unit
 Thomas Nelson Jr. (1738–1789) – Governor of Virginia, signer of Declaration of Independence
 Ralph Northam (born 1959) – 73rd Governor of Virginia
 Johnny Newman (born 1963) – University of Richmond and NBA basketball player
 Tommy Newsom (1929–2007) – saxophone player, bandleader
 Wayne Newton (born 1942) – singer, entertainer, actor
 Nick Novak § (born 1981) – placekicker for San Diego Chargers

O

 Afemo Omilami (born 1950) – actor
 Texas Jack Omohundro (1846–1880) –  frontier scout, actor, and cowboy
 Uncle Charlie Osborne (1890–1992) – musician
 Patton Oswalt (born 1969) – actor and comedian
 Rayvon Owen (born 1991) – musician, contestant on American Idol season 14
 Ken Oxendine – NFL running back

P

 Elizabeth Fry Page (1865-1943) — author and editor
 Micky Park § – singer and actor
 Ace Parker (1912–2013) – Pro Football Hall of Fame quarterback
 George S. Patton § (1885–1945) – World War II military leader; family was from Fredericksburg; attended the Virginia Military Institute
 M. M. Parsons (1822–1865) – Confederate general, second commander of Missouri State Guard in the American Civil War
 Robert Paxton – historian
 James Spriggs Payne – fourth and eighth president of Liberia
 John Payne – actor of many films including Miracle on 34th Street
 Judith Peck – award-winning visual artist & portrait painter
 Cedric Peerman – NFL running back
 Tom Peloso – member of Modest Mouse; formerly of The Hackensaw Boys
 Tony Perez (born 1942) – actor, Hill Street Blues
 Thomas J. Perrelli (born 1966) – U.S. Associate Attorney General under President Barack Obama
 Darren Perry (born 1968) – assistant coach for Green Bay Packers
 Jay Pharoah (born 1987) – comedian, impressionist, Saturday Night Live
 John Phillips § (1935–2001) – folk and pop musician of 1960s vocal group The Mamas & the Papas
 John Phillips (born 1987) – tight end for Dallas Cowboys
 Pocahontas (1595–1617) – princess of Powhatan tribe
 Edgar Allan Poe § – iconic author of "The Raven", "The Tell-Tale Heart" and other poems and stories
 Lewis F. Powell – Associate Justice of the Supreme Court of the United States 1971-87
 Darrell C. Powers - Member of Easy Company, Band of Brothers. (1923-2009)
 Chief Powhatan (1547–1618) – ruler of Eastern Virginia at time of founding of Jamestown
 Paul Pressey (born 1958) – NBA small forward, assistant coach for Cleveland Cavaliers
 Sterling Price (1809–1867) – 11th Governor of Missouri, first commander of Missouri State Guard in the American Civil War
 Faith Prince § (born 1957) – actress, Huff and Spin City
 Margaret Prior (1773-1842) — missionary, reformist, and writer
 Chesty Puller (1898–1971) – most decorated Marine in American history

Q

 George Quaintance (1902–1957) – artist
 Christopher Dillon Quinn – documentarian

R

 Edmund Randolph (1753–1813) – Governor of Virginia, U.S. Attorney General, Secretary of State
 Peyton Randolph – 1775 President of Continental Congress
 Della H. Raney (1912–1987) – first African American accepted into the United States Army Nurse Corps
 Clay Rapada (born 1981) – retired MLB pitcher
 Chris Ray (born 1982) – retired MLB pitcher 
 J. J. Redick § (born 1984) – shooting guard for New Orleans Pelicans
 Ralph Reed (born 1961) – conservative political activist, novelist
 Tim Reid (born 1944) – actor, comedian, director, WKRP in Cincinnati, Simon & Simon, Sister, Sister
 J. Sargeant Reynolds – businessman, statesman, Lieutenant Governor
 LaRoy Reynolds – linebacker for Atlanta Falcons
 Mark Reynolds § (born 1983) – MLB infielder for Colorado Rockies
 R. J. Reynolds (1850–1918) – businessman and founder of R. J. Reynolds Tobacco Company
 Vera Reynolds (1899–1962) – 1920s and '30s film actress
 Chris Richardson § (born 1984) – American Idol finalist
 Alex Riley – WWE professional wrestler
 John Ripley (1939–2008) – decorated United States Marine Corps colonel
 David L. Robbins – novelist
 Tom Robbins – author, studied art at Richmond Professional Institute (now Virginia Commonwealth University), worked for  Richmond Times Dispatch
 Jane Roberts ( 1819–1914) – 1st First Lady of Liberia
 Joseph Jenkins Roberts (1809–1876) – 1st President of Liberia
 Pat Robertson (born 1930) – Christian televangelist and political leader
 Bill "Bojangles" Robinson § (1878–1949) – dancer
 David Robinson § (born 1965) – Hall of Fame basketball player, Olympic gold medalist, 10-time NBA All-Star
 Michael Robinson (born 1983) – running back for Seattle Seahawks
 John Rolfe § (c. 1585–1622) – settler at Jamestown Settlement, first developer of cultivated tobacco for European market
 John Rollins (born 1975) – professional golfer
 Felipe Rose § – founding member of the Village People
 Tim Rose § – rock, folk, and blues singer-songwriter
 Bobby Ross § – college and pro football coach
 Aaron Rouse (born 1984) – safety for the United Football League
 Eddie Royal (born 1986) – wide receiver for San Diego Chargers
 Mark Ruffalo § (born 1967) – actor, Shutter Island, Collateral, The Avengers
 Albert Rust (1818–1870) – politician and Confederate general

S
Sa–Sm

 Elliott Sadler (born 1975) – NASCAR driver
 Bob Saget § (born 1956) – actor, comedian, television series Full House, original host of America's Funniest Home Videos
 Billy Sample (born 1955) – MLB player for Texas Rangers, New York Yankees, and Atlanta Braves
 Ralph Sampson (born 1960) – Hall of Fame center, Virginia Cavaliers and NBA
 Rick Santorum (born 1958) – lawyer and former U.S. Senator from Pennsylvania
 Joe Saunders (born 1981) – MLB pitcher
 Eric Schmidt (born 1955) – software-engineer and executive chairman of Google
 Owen Schmitt § (born 1985) – fullback for Philadelphia Eagles
 Ed Schultz (1954–2018) – left-wing radio and television host, The Ed Show
 Michael Schwimer (born 1986) – relief pitcher for Philadelphia Phillies
 George C. Scott (1927–1999) – actor; won an Academy Award for Best Actor for film Patton (1970)
 Wendell Scott (1921–1990) – first African American to race in NASCAR
 Willard Scott (1934–2021) – weather reporter on The Today Show; the original Ronald McDonald
 Winfield Scott (1786–1866) – United States Army general
 Steve Scully (born 1960) – host of C-SPAN's Washington Journal
 Rhea Seehorn (born 1972) – Kim Wexler on Better Call Saul
 Seka (born 1954) – adult film star
 Tom Shadyac (born 1958) – film director, Liar Liar, Bruce Almighty, The Nutty Professor
 Darren Sharper – retired NFL safety
 Meghann Shaughnessy – professional tennis player
 Deborah Shelton § (born 1948) – actress, Miss USA 1970
 Ricky Van Shelton – country music and gospel singer; born in Danville, Virginia 
 Lauren Shehadi (born 1983) – sportscaster and Journalist 
 John Wesley Shipp – actor, Dawson's Creek, The Flash, Guiding Light
 Clint Sintim – linebacker for New York Giants
 Scott Sizemore – infielder for New York Yankees
 Sam Sloan (born 1944) – political prisoner, kidnapping victim
 Bruce Smith (born 1963) – former NFL star, career sack leader
 Joe Smith (born 1975) – NBA player for Los Angeles Lakers
 John Smith of Jamestown § (1580–1631) – co-founder of Jamestown Settlement, first English colony in America (1607)
 Kate Smith (1909–1986) – singer best known for rendition of "God Bless America"
 Torrey Smith – wide receiver for San Francisco 49ers

Sn–Sz

 Norm Snead (born 1939) – NFL quarterback for five teams
 Sam Snead (1912–2002) – Hall of Fame golfer, winner of 82 PGA Tour events including three Masters championships
 Jason Snelling § (born 1983) – running back for Atlanta Falcons 
 Abigail Spanberger (born 1979) – U.S. Representative of Virginia's 7th Congressional district
 Chris Sprouse (born 1966) – comics artist
 John W. Snow – United States Secretary of the Treasury, chairman and CEO of CSX Corporation
 Maura Soden (born 1955) – actress
 Trey Songz (born 1984) – singer
 Scott Sowers (1963–2018) – actor
 Eric Stanley (born 1991) – violinist, arranger, YouTube personality
 Ralph Stanley (1927–2016) – musician
 Robert Stanton (born 1963) – actor, The Cosby Mysteries
 Peter Starke (1813–1888) – politician and Confederate general
 Robert Stethem § (1961–1985) – U.S. Navy Seabee diver killed by Hezbollah militants during hijacking of TWA Flight 847
 Brandon Stokley (born 1976) – wide receiver for Seattle Seahawks
 Charles Stanley (born 1932) – American southern baptism pastor
 Dick Stockton § (born 1951) – professional tennis player
 Julyan Stone (born 1988) – player for Denver Nuggets
 Curtis Strange (born 1955) – professional golfer, member of the World Golf Hall of Fame
 Greg Stroman (born 1996) – NFL cornerback
 J.E.B. Stuart (1833–1864) – Confederate general
 William Styron (1925–2006) – novelist
 Skipp Sudduth § (born 1956) – actor, John 'Sully' Sullivan on Third Watch
 Margaret Sullavan (1909–1960) – actress
 Charlie Sumner (1930–2015) – former NFL player and coach
 Carol M. Swain (born 1954) –  political scientist, Vanderbilt professor 
 Josh Sweat (born 1997) – NFL defensive end
 DeVante Swing (born 1969) – music producer, singer, founder of R&B group Jodeci 
 Wanda Sykes – comedian and actress; born in Portsmouth, Virginia

T

 Darryl Tapp (born 1984) – defensive end for Philadelphia Eagles
 Fran Tarkenton – Pro Football Hall of Fame quarterback for Minnesota Vikings; co-host of ABC-TV's That's Incredible
 Ben Tate (born 1988) – running back for Houston Texans
 Chris Taylor (born 1990) – baseball player for Los Angeles Dodgers
 Edmund Dick Taylor (1804–1891) – "Father of the Greenback"
 Lawrence Taylor (born 1959) – Pro Football Hall of Fame linebacker for New York Giants
 Peter Taylor (1917–1994) – writer; born in Tennessee, spent most of career teaching at University of Virginia
 Tyrod Taylor (born 1989) – quarterback for Buffalo Bills
 Zachary Taylor (1784–1850) – 12th President of the United States.
 Lewis Temple – escaped African-American slave who invented new kind of harpoon known as "Temple's Toggle"
 David Terrell – football player
 Logan Thomas (born 1991) – NFL tight end, played quarterback at Virginia Tech
 Scottie Thompson (born 1981) – actress, Jeanne Benoit on NCIS
 Lee Thornton (1941–2013) – journalist and correspondent for CBS, CNN, and NPR
 Matt Tifft (born 1996) – former NASCAR driver
 Timbaland (born 1974) – music producer and rapper
 Mike Tomlin (born 1972) – head coach of Pittsburgh Steelers, led team to Super Bowl XLIII championship
 Randy Tomlin – MLB pitcher; from Madison Heights
 Al Toon (born 1963) – retired football player for New York Jets
 Adrian Tracy (born 1988) – NFL and CFL defensive back
 Scott Travis (born 1961) – drummer for Judas Priest and Racer X
 Adriana Trigiani – writer, author of novel Big Stone Gap
 Curtis Turner (1924–1970) – stock car racer, member of NASCAR Hall of Fame
 Nat Turner (1800–1831) – leader of slave rebellion
 Leeann Tweeden (born 1973) – model, television personality
 Cy Twombly (1928–2011) – abstract artist
 John Tyler (1790–1862) – 10th President of the United States

U

 Kali Uchis – singer
 Skeet Ulrich – actor, starred in Scream, The Newton Boys, and Jericho
 B. J. Upton – MLB outfielder
 Justin Upton – MLB outfielder

V

 S. S. Van Dine (1888–1939) – author, creator of Philo Vance
 Lila Meade Valentine (1865–1921) – education reformer, health-care advocate, and woman's suffragist
 Marc Vann (born 1954) – actor, Conrad Ecklie on CSI: Crime Scene Investigation
 Jarvis Varnado (born 1988) – professional basketball player, 2013 NBA champion with the Miami Heat
 Phil Vassar – country music singer/songwriter; from Lynchburg
 Julian Vaughn (born 1988) – professional basketball player
 Abraham B. Venable (1758–1811) – representative and senator from Virginia
 Brandon Vera (born 1977) – mixed martial artist
 Justin Verlander (born 1983) – Major League Baseball pitcher for Houston Astros
 Charles Vess (born 1951) – fantasy artist and comic-book illustrator
 Marcus Vick (born 1984) – NFL quarterback
 Michael Vick (born 1980) – NFL quarterback
 Gene Vincent (1935–1971) – musician who pioneered styles of rock and roll and rockabilly

W
Wa–Wh

 Bobby Wadkins – professional golfer
 Lanny Wadkins – professional golfer
 Amina Wadud – Islamic Virginia Commonwealth University professor 
 Mark Warner (born 1954) – senior United States senator of Virginia 
 Billy Wagner (born 1971) – retired MLB pitcher, primarily for Houston Astros and New York Mets; also pitched for Ferrum College
 Richard Wagoner – former president of General Motors
 Maggie L. Walker – first woman to found a bank in U.S.
 Travis Wall (born 1971) – reality-television personality, So You Think You Can Dance, Season 2
 Ben Wallace – NBA basketball player
 Randall Wallace – writer, director, Braveheart, Pearl Harbor, We Were Soldiers
 Dylan Walsh § – actor, Nip/Tuck, Brooklyn South, Gabriel's Fire
 Booker T. Washington (1856–1915) – iconic educator, activist, founder of Tuskegee Institute
 George Washington (1732–1799) – 1st President of the United States, commander-in-chief of Continental Army in the American Revolutionary War, "Father of Our Country"
 Kelley Washington (born 1979) – wide receiver for Baltimore Ravens
 Benjamin Watson (born 1980) – tight end for New Orleans Saints
 B. W. Webb (born 1990) – cornerback for Dallas Cowboys
 Haley Webb – actress
 Tyler Webb – pitcher for the St. Louis Cardinals 
 Brianté Weber (born 1992) - basketball player in the Israeli Basketball Premier League
 Susan Archer Weiss (1822-1917) — poet
 Josh Wells – offensive tackle for Jacksonville Jaguars
 Kellie Wells – track hurdler, 2012 Olympic bronze medalist
 Paul Wellstone § (1944–2002) – member of U.S. Senate from Minnesota
 Jennifer Wexton (born 1968) – U.S. Representative of Virginia's 10th congressional district
 Suzanne Whang – television host, actress, House Hunters, Las Vegas
 Pernell Whitaker – professional boxer
 Jason White – NASCAR driver
 Lucky Whitehead – wide receiver for Dallas Cowboys

Wi–Wz

 Tom Wiggin § (born 1955) – actor, Kirk Anderson on As the World Turns and Joe Foster on Texas
 L. Douglas Wilder (born 1931) – first elected African-American governor of U.S. state (Governor of Virginia, 1990–1994), Richmond City mayor
 Jenny Wiley § (1760–1831) – pioneer, Native American captive
 Daryl Williams (born 1992) – offensive tackle for Carolina Panthers
 Keller Williams (born 1970) – musician
 Kiely Williams – member of 3LW and The Cheetah Girls, actress The House Bunny
 Monty Williams – former NBA player; head coach for New Orleans Hornets
 Pharrell Williams (born 1973) – Grammy Award-winning musician and producer, one-half of The Neptunes
 Reggie Williams (born 1986) – NBA basketball player
 Steven Williams § (born 1949) – actor, 21 Jump Street, L.A. Heat, Linc's
 Carl Willis (born 1960) – MLB pitcher and coach
 Curtis Wilkerson (born 1961) – MLB player for four teams
 Casey Wilson (born 1980) – actress, comedian, Happy Endings, Saturday Night Live
 David Wilson (born 1991) – running back for New York Giants
 Patrick Wilson (born 1973) – actor, Nite Owl II in Watchmen, The Conjuring, Fargo
 Russell Wilson § – quarterback for Seattle Seahawks
 Samuel V. Wilson (1923–2017) – United States Army lieutenant general
 Woodrow Wilson (1856–1924) – 28th President of the United States
 Stan Winston – film special-effects designer
 Henry Wise Jr. (1920–2003) – physician and World War II Tuskegee Airman fighter pilot 
 Julia A. Wood (1840-1927) – writer and composer
 Tom Wolfe (1930–2018) – journalist, novelist, father of "New Journalism"
 Robert J. Wood (1905–1986) – U.S. Army four-star general
 Josh Woodrum (born 1992) – quarterback for Washington Redskins
 Carter G. Woodson (1875–1950) – African-American historian, author, founder of the Association for the Study of African American Life and History
 Damien Woody (born 1977) – retired offensive lineman for New York Jets
 Link Wray – guitarist 
 David Wright (born 1982) – third baseman for New York Mets
 Avis Wyatt (born 1984) – professional basketball player
 Kerry Wynn (born 1991) – defensive end for New York Giants
 Robert E. Wynn - Member of Easy Company, Band of Brothers. (1921-2000)
 George Wythe (1726–1806) – Hampton; first professor of law in American college, William & Mary

Y

 Rachael Yamagata – singer-songwriter
 Elliott Yamin § (born 1978) – American Idol finalist
 Marl Young (1917–2009) – composer, music director, Here's Lucy
 Megan Young (born 1990) – actress, model, TV host

Z

Karenth Zabala (born 1996) – soccer player for the Bolivia women's national team
John G. Zehmer Jr. (1942–2016) – architectural historian, preservationist, photographer, and author of architectural history
Gerald Zerkin (born 1949) – lawyer
Emanuel Zervakis (1930–2003) – NASCAR Cup Series driver
Zeda Zhang (born 1987) – professional wrestler
Boris Zhukov (born 1959) – professional wrestler
Craig Zimmerman (born 1974) – actor
George Zimmerman (born 1983) – man responsible for fatally shooting Trayvon Martin in Sanford, Florida
Ryan Zimmerman § (born 1984) – first baseman for the Washington Nationals
Nell Zink (born 1964) – novelist
Charlotte Zolotow (1915–2013) – writer, poet, publisher of children's books
Zach Zwinak (born 1992) – former Penn State football running back

See also

By educational institution affiliation

 List of College of William & Mary alumni
 List of presidents of the College of William & Mary
 List of Hampden–Sydney College alumni
 List of Liberty University people
 List of presidents of Longwood University
 List of University of Richmond people
 List of University of Virginia people
 List of Virginia Commonwealth University alumni
 List of Virginia Tech alumni
 List of Virginia Theological Seminary people
 List of Washington and Lee University people

By governmental office

 List of attorneys general of Virginia
 List of colonial governors of Virginia
 List of governors of Virginia
 List of justices of the Supreme Court of Virginia
 List of United States representatives from Virginia
 List of United States senators from Virginia

By location

 List of people from Annandale, Virginia
 List of people from Arlington, Virginia
 List of people from Charlottesville, Virginia
 List of people from Great Falls, Virginia
 List of people from Hampton Roads, Virginia
 List of people from McLean, Virginia
 List of people from Reston, Virginia

Other
 List of Virginia suffragists

References

Lists of people from Virginia